This article is about the particular significance of the year 1793 to Wales and its people.

Incumbents
Lord Lieutenant of Anglesey - Henry Paget 
Lord Lieutenant of Brecknockshire and Monmouthshire – Henry Somerset, 5th Duke of Beaufort
Lord Lieutenant of Caernarvonshire - Thomas Bulkeley, 7th Viscount Bulkeley
Lord Lieutenant of Cardiganshire – Wilmot Vaughan, 1st Earl of Lisburne
Lord Lieutenant of Carmarthenshire – John Vaughan  
Lord Lieutenant of Denbighshire - Richard Myddelton  
Lord Lieutenant of Flintshire - Sir Roger Mostyn, 5th Baronet 
Lord Lieutenant of Glamorgan – John Stuart, Lord Mountstuart (until 14 March) John Stuart, Lord Mount Stuart
Lord Lieutenant of Merionethshire - Watkin Williams (until 4 December); Sir Watkin Williams-Wynn, 5th Baronet  (from 4 December)
Lord Lieutenant of Montgomeryshire – George Herbert, 2nd Earl of Powis
Lord Lieutenant of Pembrokeshire – Richard Philipps, 1st Baron Milford
Lord Lieutenant of Radnorshire – Thomas Harley

Bishop of Bangor – John Warren
Bishop of Llandaff – Richard Watson
Bishop of St Asaph – Lewis Bagot
Bishop of St Davids – Samuel Horsley (until 7 December)

Events
22 November - Two ships, the Morva and the Cavendish, are wrecked on The Smalls off Pembrokeshire.
Construction of Clydach Ironworks begins.
A group of Quakers from Nantucket Island settle at Milford Haven, where they attempt to set up a whaling industry.
Y Cylchgrawn Cymraeg is the first political journal to be published in the Welsh language.

Arts and literature

New books
Edward Daniel Clarke - A Tour Through the South of England, Wales, and Part of Ireland, Made During the Summer of 1791

Births
17 January - Owen Owen Roberts, physician (d. 1866)
8 February - Daniel Rees, clergyman and hymn-writer (d. 1857)
March - Lewis Lewis (Lewsyn yr Heliwr), political activist (date of death unknown)
19 July - John Propert, physician (d. 1867)
10 August - John Crichton-Stuart, 2nd Marquess of Bute (d. 1848)
11 October - Maria James, poet and domestic servant (d. 1868 in the United States)
25 September - Felicia Hemans, poet (d. 1835)

Deaths
January - Marged ferch Ifan, harpist, 96
5 January - Elizabeth Griffith, actress and writer, 73?
14 March - Cecil de Cardonnel, 2nd Baroness Dynevor, 57
22 May - John Lloyd, antiquary, 60

References

Wales
Wales